Thirupperundurai is a village in the  
Avadaiyarkoilrevenue block of Pudukkottai district, Tamil Nadu, India.

Demographics 

As per the 2001 census, Thirupperunthurai had a total population of 513 with 262 males and 251 females. Out of the total population 291 people were literate.

References

Villages in Pudukkottai district